KFLI (104.7 FM, "Cool 104.7") is a radio station broadcasting a classic hits format. Licensed to Des Arc, Arkansas, United States, it serves the Little Rock, Arkansas, area.  The station is currently owned by Flinn Broadcasting, Inc.  Its studios are located in Searcy and the transmitter is in Bullard.

References

External links

FLI
Classic hits radio stations in the United States